The 1977 British Grand Prix was a Formula One motor race held at Silverstone on 16 July 1977. It was the tenth race of the 1977 World Championship of F1 Drivers and the 1977 International Cup for F1 Constructors.

The 68-lap race was won from pole position by local driver James Hunt, driving a McLaren-Ford, with Austrian driver Niki Lauda second in a Ferrari and Swedish driver Gunnar Nilsson third in a Lotus-Ford. The race marked the debut of Canadian driver Gilles Villeneuve, as well as the first outing for the first turbocharged Formula One car, the Renault RS01, driven by Frenchman Jean-Pierre Jabouille, who retired when the turbocharger had failed after 16 laps. It was also the last race to be given the honorific designation of the European Grand Prix.

Pre-qualifying
Owing to the large number of entrants, a special system of pre-qualification was devised, taking place on the Wednesday before the race. Fourteen cars took part, most from teams which were not members of FOCA. Debutant Gilles Villeneuve also took part, along with Patrick Tambay, Jean-Pierre Jarier, Brett Lunger, Patrick Nève, Mikko Kozarowitzky, another debutant Andy Sutcliffe, Guy Edwards, Tony Trimmer, David Purley, Emilio de Villota, Brian Henton, Arturo Merzario and yet another debutant, Brian McGuire.

Kozarowitzky crashed his RAM March in the first session, and Purley suffered a huge accident in the second session, when the throttle stuck open on his LEC. He suffered multiple fractures and spent many months recovering. He later returned to racing but never appeared in a World Championship Formula One race again. The fastest five drivers after both sessions were Villeneuve, Tambay, Jarier, Lunger and Henton, all of whom went through to the full qualifying sessions. Merzario and Nève were subsequently also allowed through, as was de Villota, who replaced Harald Ertl when the Austrian driver withdrew his entry.

Qualifying
Henton and de Villota were eliminated after the qualifying sessions, along with Alex Ribeiro and Clay Regazzoni. James Hunt took pole position by less than 3 tenths from Northern Irish racing driver John Watson in the Brabham, whilst the rest of the top 10 qualifiers were Niki Lauda, Jody Scheckter, Gunnar Nilsson, Mario Andretti, Hans Joachim Stuck, Vittorio Brambilla, Gilles Villeneuve and Ronnie Peterson in the leading Tyrrell. It was also proven to be a relief for Hunt to secure pole position in front of the home crowd, this was because British racing drivers had not been lucky all season up to this point.

Classification

Pre-qualifying

Qualifying

Race
James Hunt had started from pole position with John Watson alongside him. But, Hunt did not get a good start due to clutch problems and dropped back to 4th as a result. This allowed Watson to take the lead into the first corner ahead of Niki Lauda's Ferrari and Jody Scheckter's Wolf. However, as the race had slowly progressed Hunt eventually managed to re-overtake Lauda and Scheckter and re-passed Watson for the race lead as the British drivers were running first and second. But the order of the top 2 did not stay the same as Watson started to slow when his fuel system failed on lap 53  and retired only 8 laps later. With Watson dropping out of contention this promoted Niki Lauda to second and Jody Scheckter to third. But Scheckter was also forced to retire later on when his engine failed on lap 60 which gave Mario Andretti in the leading Lotus third before his engine had also failed 3 laps later but was classified 14th. As Gunnar Nilsson in the remaining Lotus was given 3rd place and stayed there. James Hunt had finally managed to take his first win of the season for McLaren to the delight of the British fans, ahead of championship leader Niki Lauda, Gunnar Nilsson, Jochen Mass in the second McLaren, Hans Joachim Stuck in the remaining Brabham and Jacques Laffite in the only Ligier.

Championship standings after the race

Drivers' Championship standings

Constructors' Championship standings

References

British Grand Prix
British Grand Prix
Grand Prix
European Grand Prix
British Grand Prix